Haddenham railway station may refer to:

 Haddenham & Thame Parkway railway station, a current station in the town of Haddenham, Buckinghamshire, England
 Haddenham railway station (Buckinghamshire), a former station in the town of Haddenham, Buckinghamshire, England
 Haddenham railway station (Cambridgeshire), a former station in Cambridgeshire, England